Dahomey (now Benin) competed in the Summer Olympic Games for the first time at the 1972 Summer Olympics in Munich, West Germany.

Athletics

Men
Track & road events

Boxing

Men

References
Official Olympic Reports

Nations at the 1972 Summer Olympics
1972